The Queen is a 2006 British biographical drama film that depicts the events following the death of Diana, Princess of Wales in 1997. Initially, the Royal Family regard Diana's death as a private affair and thus not to be treated as an official royal death, in contrast with the views of Prime Minister Tony Blair and Diana's ex-husband, Prince Charles, who favour the general public's desire for an official expression of grief. Matters are further complicated by the media, royal protocol regarding Diana's official status, and wider issues about republicanism.

The film was written by Peter Morgan, directed by Stephen Frears, and starring Helen Mirren in the title role of Queen Elizabeth II. The film's production and release coincided with a revival of favourable public sentiment in respect to the monarchy, a downturn in fortunes for Blair, and the British inquest into the death of Diana, Operation Paget. Actor Michael Sheen reprised his role as Blair from The Deal in 2003, and he did so again in The Special Relationship in 2010.

The Queen garnered general critical and popular acclaim for Mirren playing the title role, which earned her numerous awards, namely the Academy Award, the Volpi Cup for Best Actress, the BAFTA Award, and the Golden Globe Award. Mirren was praised by the Queen herself and was invited to dinner at Buckingham Palace. However, Mirren could not attend due to filming commitments in Hollywood.

Plot
The 1997 general election has Tony Blair and the Labour Party elected as government, on a manifesto of reform and modernisation. Less than four months later, Diana, Princess of Wales, is killed in a car crash at the Alma Bridge tunnel in Paris.

Immediately, her death presents problems for her former husband, Prince Charles, and the Prime Minister, Tony Blair, to accord the mother of a future king who is no longer a member of the royal family. Queen Elizabeth II wonders if Blair will turn his modernisation pledge on to the royal family since he attempts to have her reconsider her views on the funeral plans. Diana's family, the Spencers, calls for the funeral to be private.

In the press, Diana is dubbed the "People's Princess"; this begins an outpouring of grief by the general public in broadcasts, and displays of floral tributes so numerous at Buckingham and Kensington Palaces that the main entrances onto the complexes have to be rerouted. The royal family's senior members make no effort to acknowledge Diana's significance to society as the Queen feels that her duty is to comfort and shield her grandsons following the death of their mother and so remains on holiday at Balmoral. The royal family's popularity plummets, while Blair's approval rises as he responds to the royal family's public outcry of inaction.

Blair's attempts to guide the royal family through the controversy are met with resistance: the Queen describes them as a surrender to public hysteria. Despite the Queen and Prince Philip's indignation toward any sympathy toward Diana or acknowledgment of the country's mourning, he is encouraged by the private secretaries of both the Prince of Wales and the Queen to continue with his attempts to change the attitude of the royal family. As Britain continues its outpouring of grief, Blair attempts to defend the royal family publicly, but his attempts are futile. Blair's compassion earns him overwhelming praise and adoration, while the royal family's indifference earns them fiery condemnation from the people. As Britain's outrage hits a critical mass, Blair cannot placate the Queen's refusal to acknowledge Diana and the public any longer, revealing to her that 70% of the country believes her actions are damaging to the monarchy, and "1 in 4" people are in favour of abolishing the monarchy altogether. Blair adamantly insists that the royal family fly the flag at Buckingham Palace at half-mast, that the Queen pay her respects to Diana, and give a public address consoling the country.

Although she is demoralised by the country's reaction and the Prime Minister's suggestions, the Queen comes to realise that the world has changed during her reign. She and Prince Philip return to London, despite their disagreement. The Queen finally pays public tribute on live television to Diana's significance to the nation and society and can somewhat quell Britain's agony. The royal family attends the public funeral for Diana at Westminster Abbey.

At Blair's next meeting with the Queen, they exchange views about what has happened since their last meeting, including the controversy surrounding Diana's death and the actions that followed. Then she cautions the prime minister that, just as public opinion has changed about how the royal family should react to a new Britain, so must he as he may very well find himself in the same position of changing public opinion.

Cast

The film uses archival footage of Diana, Princess of Wales, Camilla Parker Bowles, Nicholas Owen, Julia Somerville, Martyn Lewis, Trevor McDonald and John Suchet.

Production

Filming
The screenplay was written by Peter Morgan. It was produced by Pathé Pictures and Granada Productions (ITV Productions). Stephen Frears had a clause in his contract from The Deal that allowed him to direct any follow-ups or sequels, and he was officially announced as director in September 2003. The film was shot on location in the United Kingdom, in England in London, Halton House and Waddesdon Manor, in Buckinghamshire, Brocket Hall in Hertfordshire and in Scotland at Balmoral Castle, Castle Fraser and Cluny Castle in Aberdeenshire, and Blairquhan Castle and Culzean Castle in South Ayrshire.

Set design
The sets were designed by Alan MacDonald, which won him Best Art Direction in a Contemporary Film from the Art Directors Guild and Best Technical Achievement at the British Independent Film Awards.

Portraying the Queen
Mirren says transforming herself into the Queen came almost naturally after the wig and glasses, since she shares a default facial expression—a slightly downturned mouth—with the monarch. She regularly reviewed film and video footage of Elizabeth and kept photographs in her trailer during production. She also undertook extensive voice coaching, faithfully reproducing the Queen's delivery of her televised speech to the world. Morgan has said that her performance was so convincing that, by the end of production, crew members who had been accustomed to slouching or relaxing when they addressed her were standing straight up and respectfully folding their hands behind their backs. Mirren arranged to spend time off-camera with the supporting cast playing other members of the Royal Family, including James Cromwell, Alex Jennings and Sylvia Syms so they would be as comfortable with each other as a real family.

To enhance the contrast of their different worlds, shots involving the Queen were taken in 35mm film and those of Tony Blair in 16mm film.

Television viewership and home media
ITV's role in the production of the film allowed them an option for its television premiere and it was broadcast on 2 September 2007 (coinciding that weekend with a memorial service to Diana) to an average audience of 7.9 million, winning its timeslot. The DVD was released in the UK on 12 March 2007. Special features include a making-of featurette and an audio commentary by Stephen Frears, writer Peter Morgan and Robert Lacey, biographer of Queen Elizabeth II. It was released on Blu-ray and DVD in the USA on 24 April 2007 and, US DVD sales had exceeded $29 million.

Historical accuracy
Some aspects of the characters are known to be true to their real-life counterparts.  According to Morgan, "cabbage" is an actual term of endearment Philip used for his wife (mon chou – "my cabbage" – is a standard affectionate nickname in French).

Other elements represent characteristics associated with people depicted. The electric guitar seen behind Blair in his personal office is a reference to his past membership in the band Ugly Rumours while a student. The Newcastle United football jersey he wears to a family breakfast is a reference to his support of that team. The film also shows Alastair Campbell coining the term "The People's Princess", but in 2007 he revealed that it was Tony Blair who came up with it.

A notable inaccuracy is that Robin Janvrin is represented as the Queen's private secretary during the aftermath of Diana's death. In fact, that position was then occupied by Janvrin's predecessor, Sir Robert Fellowes; Janvrin was the deputy private secretary until 1999. However, the film is accurate in depicting Janvrin as the person who delivered the news of Diana's accident to the Queen at Balmoral during the night. The change may have been made to avoid confusing the audience by depicting the complicated family relationships involved— Fellowes was, in fact, also Diana's brother-in-law (by his marriage to her sister, Lady Jane Spencer) and is a first cousin of Sarah, Duchess of York.

Reception

Box office
The film exceeded box-office expectations; with a budget of $15 million the film earned $56.4 million in the United States and Canada.

Critical reception
On the review aggregator website Rotten Tomatoes, the film holds an approval rating of 97%, based on 203 reviews, with an average rating of 8.4/10. The website's critical consensus reads, "Full of wit, humour and pathos, Stephen Frears' moving portrait looks at life of the British royals during the period after Princess Diana's death." On Metacritic, the film has a weighted average score of 91 out of 100, based on 37 critics, indicating "universal acclaim".

Before the film was released, critics praised both Stephen Frears and Peter Morgan, who later received Golden Globe and Academy Award nominations for Best Director and Best Screenplay. Michael Sheen's performance as Tony Blair earned him particular acclaim. Helen Mirren's portrayal, which garnered her acclaim from critics around the world, made her a favourite for the Academy Award for Best Actress well before the film was released in cinemas. After its showing at the Venice Film Festival, Mirren received a five-minute-long standing ovation. Roger Ebert came out of recovery from surgery to give the film a review, in which he called it "spellbinding" and gave it four out of four stars.

Amongst the few negative reviews, Slant Magazine's Nick Schager criticised the insider portraiture of the film as "somewhat less than revelatory, in part because Morgan's script succumbs to cutie-pie jokiness [...] and broad caricature", mentioning particularly "James Cromwell's Prince Philip, who envisions the crowned heads as exiled victims and the gathering crowds as encroaching 'Zulus'".

Accolades
Mirren won in the leading actress category at the Academy Awards, the British Academy Film Awards, the Critics' Choice Movie Awards, the Golden Globe Awards, and the Screen Actors Guild Awards. Mirren also won awards from the Boston Society of Film Critics, the Los Angeles Film Critics' Association, the National Board of Review, the National Society of Film Critics, the New York Film Critics' Circle, the Washington D.C. Area Film Critics Association, and many other awards of which are listed below except she was nominated for at least three more. In most of her acceptance speeches, she expressed her admiration for the real Queen, and dedicated both her Golden Globe and her Oscar to Elizabeth II.

As of 2022, Mirren from The Queen and Forest Whitaker from The Last King of Scotland are the only two lead performances for portraying real-life leaders, and is the only lead actor to ever sweep the rarest achievements known as "The Big Four" critics awards (LAFCA, NBR, NYFCC, NSFC) as well as win the Oscar, BAFTA, Critics' Choice, Globe Golbe, and SAG awards in the same year.

Top ten lists
The film appeared on many US critics' top ten lists of the best films of 2006.

1st – Frank Scheck, The Hollywood Reporter
1st – William Arnold, Seattle Post-Intelligencer
2nd – Richard Roeper, Chicago Sun Times
2nd – Lou Lumenick, New York Post
2nd – Michael Rechtshaffen, The Hollywood Reporter
3rd – David Ansen, Newsweek
3rd – Ella Taylor, LA Weekly
3rd – Richard Schickel, TIME magazine
3rd – Sheri Linden, The Hollywood Reporter
4th – Chris Kaltenbach, The Baltimore Sun
4th – Claudia Puig, USA Today
4th – Kenneth Turan, Los Angeles Times (tied with Venus)
4th – Stephen Holden, The New York Times
5th – Dennis Harvey, Variety
5th – Kirk Honeycutt, The Hollywood Reporter
5th – Mick LaSalle, San Francisco Chronicle
5th – Stephanie Zacharek, Salon (tied with Marie Antoinette)
6th – Marjorie Baumgarten, The Austin Chronicle
6th – Michael Sragow, The Baltimore Sun
6th – Shawn Levy, The Oregonian
7th – Lawrence Toppman, The Charlotte Observer

7th – Peter Travers, Rolling Stone
9th – Jack Mathews, New York Daily News
9th – Lisa Schwarzbaum, Entertainment Weekly
9th – Michael Phillips, Chicago Tribune
9th – Michael Wilmington, Chicago Tribune
9th – Nathan Rabin, The A.V. Club
9th – Ty Burr, The Boston Globe
10th – Glenn Kenny, Premiere
10th – Staff, Film Threat
General top ten
Carina Chocano, Los Angeles Times
Carrie Rickey, The Philadelphia Inquirer
Dana Stevens, Slate
Joe Morgenstern, The Wall Street Journal
Liam Lacey and Rick Groen, The Globe and Mail
Peter Rainer, The Christian Science Monitor
Ruthe Stein, San Francisco Chronicle
Steven Rea, The Philadelphia Inquirer

Soundtrack

The soundtrack album was released on the Milan label on 26 September 2006. The original score and songs were composed by Alexandre Desplat and performed by the London Symphony Orchestra. The album was nominated for the Academy Award for Best Original Score. It was also nominated for the BAFTA Award for Best Film Music (it lost to the score of Babel).

Notes

References

External links

 
 
 
 
 The Queen at itv.com
  "The 34 best political movies ever made", Ann Hornaday, The Washington Post Jan. 23, 2020), ranked #34

Interviews
Helen Mirren Interview at The Guardian

2006 films
2000s English-language films
2006 biographical drama films
British biographical drama films
French biographical drama films
Italian biographical drama films
English-language French films
English-language Italian films
BAFTA winners (films)
Best Film BAFTA Award winners
Biographical films about British royalty
Cultural depictions of Tony Blair
Cultural depictions of Charles III
British docudrama films
Films scored by Alexandre Desplat
Films about Diana, Princess of Wales
Films about Elizabeth II
Films directed by Stephen Frears
Films featuring a Best Actress Academy Award-winning performance
Films featuring a Best Drama Actress Golden Globe-winning performance
Films set in 1997
Films set in London
Films set in palaces
Films set in Scotland
2000s political drama films
Films with screenplays by Peter Morgan
ITV television dramas
Television series by ITV Studios
Icon Productions films
2006 drama films
Golden Eagle Award (Russia) for Best Foreign Language Film winners
2000s British films
2000s French films